Belokamenny (masculine), Belokamennaya (feminine), or Belokamennoye (neuter) is the name of several rural localities in Russia.

Modern localities
Belokamenny (rural locality), a rural locality (a settlement) under the administrative jurisdiction of the Town of Asbest in Sverdlovsk Oblast

Historical localities
Belokamennaya, a colony included in Alexandrovskaya Volost of Alexandrovsky Uyezd of Arkhangelsk Governorate of the Russian SFSR upon its establishment in 1920